The 38th German Skeleton Championship 2004 was held on 10-11 January 2004 at the Königssee track.

Men

Women

External links 
 Resultlist at the BSD Site

Skeleton championships in Germany
2004 in German sport
2004 in skeleton